U.S. Route 283 (US 283) is a United States Numbered Highway whose southern terminus is in the state of Texas near Brady. It runs primarily south–north through rural areas of the state, via towns and cities such as Coleman, Albany, and Seymour, before crossing the Red River into Oklahoma north of Vernon.

Route description
The highway travels through rural areas of McCulloch County before entering Coleman County. US 283 maintains its rural route before entering the town of Santa Anna, beginning an overlap with US 84. The two highways travel northwest together to the town of Coleman before they split. US 283 returns to a rural route once again and intersects State Highway 36 (SH 36) in southern Callahan County. The highway runs through the city of Baird, where it crosses Interstate 20 (I-20). US 283 next enters the city of Albany, where it shares a short overlap with US 180 and SH 6. Just south of Throckmorton, US 283 begins a lengthy overlap with US 183. The two routes travel to Seymour and begin an overlap with US 277 and US 82. US 183 and US 283 separate from US 82 and US 277 in the unincorporated community of Mabelle. In Vernon, US 283 separates from US 183 at a junction with US 70 and US 287. US 283 runs in a slight northwest direction before crossing the Red River into Oklahoma.

The segment that is concurrent with US 84 in Coleman County and the segment that is concurrent with US 277 between Seymour and Mabelle are part of the National Highway System (NHS), a network of roads important to the country's economy, defense, and mobility.

History
The US 283 route and number were originally approved by the American Association of State Highway Officials (AASHO) in 1930, and the route was officially listed as part of the Texas state highway system by 1932. Its southern terminus was originally near Brownwood in the vicinity of the present-day city of Early, which would be incorporated in 1951. It ran north along present-day US 183 to Rising Star and Cisco, then northwest to Albany along what is now SH 6, at which point it continued north into Oklahoma along its present route.

The segment of present-day US 283 between Albany and Throckmorton had been designated as part of the Southwest Trail, connecting Laredo to the Oklahoma state line near Burkburnett, in 1917. By 1922, the roadway connecting Cisco and Throckmorton was shown as part of SH 23. SH 23 was extended to Seymour in 1923 and via Vernon to the Oklahoma state line in 1925. The segment from Brownwood to Rising Star was designated as SH 129 in 1928, and it and US 283 were briefly cosigned until 1934, when SH 129 was cancelled. By 1935, US 283 and SH 23 were cosigned from Rising Star to the Oklahoma state line.

By the time the state highway system was redescribed in 1939, US 283 had replaced SH 23 from Brownwood to Brady and was extended to US 83 in Junction, replacing SH 9 between Brady and Mason and SH 29 between Mason and Junction. The codesignation with SH 23 was also removed, as that route was cancelled. AASHO had also approved the extension of US 183 into Texas that year; it overlapped US 283 from the Oklahoma state line to Albany, then ran over former SH 191 via Baird to Coleman, and replaced SH 16 to Brady. From here, US 87, US 183, and US 283 ran together to Mason, where US 87 separated and US 183 and US 283 continued concurrently to Junction. In 1940, TxDOT requested that the US 283 designation be removed between Brady and Junction, but this was denied by AASHO.

In 1951, the US 183 and US 283 designations were switched south of Albany, in anticipation of an extension of US 183 to Corpus Christi, and also to reduce the overlap in the two routes. US 283 took over the routing of US 183 from Albany to Brady; US 183 was rerouted to run from Early to Refugio, replacing SH 284 and SH 74, and overlapping SH 29. The roadway from Brady to Junction became part of an extended US 377. US 283 is indicated as having run concurrently with US 87 from its current southern terminus to the center of Brady until at least 1972.

In 1952, US 183 was rerouted along its current configuration from Cisco via Breckenridge to the current southern end of its concurrency with US 283 near Throckmorton, replacing SH 187 and a segment of SH 6. This was done to further reduce the concurrency of the two routes, and because it was desired to route US 183 over roadways that were superior and saw more traffic. The road between Albany and Cisco was renumbered as an extension of US 380, and would become part of SH 6 in 1971.

The US 84/US 283 bypass route around the east side of Coleman had been proposed by 1965. The project was let in 1968, and construction was completed by 1969. The section on the south side of Coleman that did not overlap SH 206 became an extension of FM 53 (now SH 153).

In 2006, US 283, along with US 183 and US 277, was redesignated to follow a new freeway bypass around Seymour. The bypass was completed in 2009, and the former route was retained on the state highway system as a business route.

Junction list

Seymour business route
US 283 has one business route in Texas, inventoried as Business U.S. Highway 283-B (Bus. US 283-B), in Seymour. It runs concurrently with Business U.S. Highway 183-B (Bus. US 183-B) and Business U.S. Highway 277-C (Bus. US 277-C) for its entire length. The combined business route begins just south of the Seymour city limits at an interchange with the US 183/US 277/US 283 freeway bypass. It runs north along Main Street, intersecting Spur 334, before reaching a junction with SH 114 (Ingram Street). Westbound SH 114 runs concurrently with the business route until they reach US 82 (California Street). Here, westbound SH 114 turns onto westbound US 82, and FM 422 begins to the east. The business routes and eastbound US 82 run concurrently to the north, curving to the northeast at an intersection with RM Spur 1919, before meeting mainline RM 1919. Business US 183/US 277/US 283 end at another interchange with the US 183/US 277/US 283 bypass northeast of the city, with eastbound US 82 joining the other three routes toward Mabelle.

The business routes, along with Spur 334, were designated on August 24, 2006, while the designations of US 183, US 277, and US 283 were all shifted onto the freeway bypass to the south and east of Seymour. Upon completion of the bypass in 2009, the former route through the city along Main Street, along with the newly-constructed connection to the bypass, was redesignated Business US 183/US 277/US 283, while the  former segment between the US 277 south cutoff and Main Street became Spur 334.

References

83-2
Transportation in McCulloch County, Texas
Transportation in Coleman County, Texas
Transportation in Callahan County, Texas
Transportation in Shackelford County, Texas
Transportation in Throckmorton County, Texas
Transportation in Baylor County, Texas
Transportation in Wilbarger County, Texas
2 in Texas